Murder Most Foul is the third of four Miss Marple films made by Metro-Goldwyn-Mayer. Loosely based on the 1952 novel Mrs McGinty's Dead by Agatha Christie, it stars Margaret Rutherford as Miss Jane Marple, Charles Tingwell as Inspector Craddock, and Stringer Davis (Rutherford's husband) as Mr Stringer. The story is ostensibly based on Christie's novel, but notably changes the action and the characters. Hercule Poirot is replaced by Miss Marple and most of the other characters are not in the novel.

The film was released in 1964. It was directed by George Pollock, and David Pursall is credited with the adaptation. The music is by Ron Goodwin.

The title is a quotation from Hamlet (I.v.27-28), where the Ghost comments about his own death: "Murder most foul as in the best it is/But this most foul, strange and unnatural."

The third film in the MGM series, this was preceded by Murder, She Said and Murder at the Gallop, and followed by Murder Ahoy!, all with Rutherford starring as Miss Marple.

Plot
Margaret McGinty, a barmaid and former actress, is found hanged, and her lodger, Harold Taylor, caught at the scene, seems plainly guilty. Everyone believes it to be an open-and-shut case  except for Miss Marple. She is the lone holdout in the jury that tries him, leading to a mistrial.

Despite the disapproval of Inspector Craddock (Charles Tingwell), Miss Marple decides to delve into the case. She poses as a gatherer for a church jumble sale to enter and search Mrs McGinty's home. She finds a newspaper with words cut out and several programmes for a murder mystery play, Murder She Said, recently performed in the town. These clues lead her to suspect that Mrs McGinty was blackmailing a member of the repertory company, the Cosgood Players.

Miss Marple auditions for the Cosgood Players under their actor/manager Driffold Cosgood (Ron Moody). Cosgood is unimpressed by her acting ability, but as she mentions that she has independent means, he hopes for a financier and allows her to join the company without being paid. Miss Marple knows that she is on the right track when one of the actors, George Rowton (Maurice Good), is poisoned moments later. She secures accommodation in the boarding house in which the cast is staying to further her investigation. Someone leaves a copy of Cosgood's play Remember September in her bedroom for her to read. With the help of Mr Stringer, Mrs Marple investigates the staging history of that play and also Mrs McGinty's past connection to the company. An attempt to silence Miss Marple claims the life of another actress. Expecting another attempt during a theatre performance, Miss Marple manages to unmask the killer. Cosgood appeals to her to finance Remember September, but she refuses: "Mr Cosgood, whatever else I am, I am definitely no angel."

Cast
 Margaret Rutherford as Miss Jane Marple
 Ron Moody as H. Driffold Cosgood
 Bud Tingwell (credited as Charles Tingwell) as Inspector Craddock
 Andrew Cruickshank (credited as "Andrew Cruikshank") as Justice Crosby
 Megs Jenkins as Gladys Thomas, Mrs McGinty's sister
 Dennis Price as Harris Tumbrill, a theatrical agent  
 Ralph Michael as Ralph Summers, a philandering former matinee idol 
 James Bolam as Bill Hanson, an actor
 Stringer Davis as Jim Stringer
 Francesca Annis as Sheila Upward, an actress and heiress engaged to Bill Hanson
 Alison Seebohm as Eva McGonigall, a premonition-prone actress, recently broken up with George Rowton
 Terry Scott as Police Constable Wells
 Pauline Jameson as Maureen Summers, Ralph's wife
 Maurice Good as George Rowton
 Annette Kerr as Dorothy, an actress and murder victim
 Windsor Davies as Sergeant Brick
 Neil Stacy (as "Neil Stacey") as Arthur
 Stella Tanner as Flory, the landlady

Production
The courthouse seen behind the opening credit "Metro-Goldwyn-Mayer Presents" is Aylesbury Crown Court in the market square of Aylesbury in Buckinghamshire.

The police station to which Miss Marple is taken for questioning by Inspector Craddock and Sergeant Brick, following the death of the actor George Rowton, is on Shady Lane in  Watford, Hertfordshire.

The theatre in which the Cosgood Players perform Fly By Night and where much of the action takes place is the Palace Theatre on Clarendon Road in Watford. At the time of filming the theatre was being run by Jimmy Perry (co-creator of Dad's Army) and his wife Gilda.

The YMCA where Mr. Stringer stays and where Miss Marple meets him in the grounds to discuss her progress in the investigation – supposedly near the Palace Theatre where the Cosgood Players are performing, and their lodging house nearby – is actually Memorial Park in Pinner, in what is now the London Borough of Harrow.

The scene of the murder and associated village scenes were filmed in Sarratt near Rickmansworth in Hertfordshire.

Notes
The title of the first film in the series, Murder She Said, is also the title of the Cosgood Players production that appears on the playbills in the first murder victim's suitcase. According to the playbill, the play was written by Agatha Christie.

An actual Christie play, ’The Mousetrap’, is referenced by the director (Moody) at one point in the film.

Margaret Rutherford performs a section of the poem "The Shooting of Dan McGrew" by Robert W. Service in the film.

References

External links
 
 
 

1964 films
1960s mystery films
British mystery films
Films based on Miss Marple books
Films based on Hercule Poirot books
Films directed by George Pollock
Metro-Goldwyn-Mayer films

Films scored by Ron Goodwin
Films shot at MGM-British Studios
1960s English-language films
1960s British films